The Dark is the second novel by Irish writer John McGahern, published in 1965.

Plot introduction
The Dark is set in Ireland's rural north-west, and it focuses on an adolescent and his emerging sexuality, as seen through the lens of the strained and complex relationship he has with his father, Mahoney.

References

External links
 1966 Time magazine review of The Dark

1965 novels
Book censorship in the Republic of Ireland
Child sexual abuse in literature
Novels by John McGahern
Novels set in Ireland
Faber and Faber books
Censored books